The 1961 German football championship was the culmination of the football season in the Federal Republic of Germany in 1960–61. 1. FC Nürnberg were crowned champions for a record eighth time after a group stage and a final, having previously won the title in 1921, 1922, 1924, 1925, 1927, 1936 and 1948. It was the club's first appearance in the final since its 1948 title.

On the strength of this title, the club participated in the 1961–62 European Cup, where 1. FCN lost to S.L. Benfica in the quarter finals.

Runners-up Borussia Dortmund made its fourth appearance in the national title game, having lost the championship in 1949 and won it in 1956 and 1957.

The format used to determine the German champion was the same as the one used in the 1960 season. Nine clubs qualified for the tournament, with the runners-up of Southwest and South having to play a qualifying match. The remaining eight clubs then played a home-and-away round in two groups of four, with the two group winners entering the final.

Qualified teams
The teams qualified through the 1960–61 Oberliga season:

Competition

Qualifying round

Group 1

Group 2

Final

References

Sources
 kicker Allmanach 1990, by kicker, page 165 & 177 - German championship 1961

External links
 German Championship 1960-61 at Weltfussball.de
 Germany - Championship 1960-61 at RSSSF.com
 German championship 1961 at Fussballdaten.de

1961
1